Caryota no is a species of flowering plant in the family Arecaceae. It is endemic to the Island of Borneo.  Its specific epithet is from the common name in Malaysian, .  It is called baroch by the Dayak people of Singhi.  The fibers, which are used for fishing lines or woven into baskets, are called talì onus.  The extremely hard wood is also used like similar species.

References

no
Endemic flora of Borneo
Least concern plants
Plants described in 1871
Taxa named by Odoardo Beccari
Taxonomy articles created by Polbot